Bombshell is a 1933 American pre-Code romantic screwball comedy film directed by Victor Fleming and starring Jean Harlow, Lee Tracy, Frank Morgan, C. Aubrey Smith, Mary Forbes and Franchot Tone. It is based on the unproduced play of the same name by Caroline Francke and Mack Crane, and was adapted for the screen by John Lee Mahin and Jules Furthman.

Plot
Movie star Lola Burns (Jean Harlow) is angry with her studio publicist E. J. "Space" Hanlon (Lee Tracy), who feeds the press with endless provocative stories about her. Lola's family and staff are another cause of distress for her, as everybody is always trying to take her money. All Burns really wants is to live a normal life and prove to the public that she's not a sexy vamp, but a proper lady. She attempts a few romances and tries to adopt a baby, but Hanlon, who secretly loves her, thwarts all her plans.

Burns decides she can't stand any more of such a life, and flees. Far from the movie fluff, she meets wealthy and romantic Gifford Middleton (Franchot Tone), who hates the movies and therefore has never heard about Lola Burns and her bad press. They soon fall in love, and Gifford proposes marriage. Burns is to meet her fiancé's parents, but everything collapses when her family finds her, and the Middletons find out she is a movie star. Burns feels hurt by the rude way Gifford and his parents dump her, and accepts Hanlon's suggestion to return to Hollywood with no regrets. She does not know that the three Middletons were all actors hired by Hanlon himself.

At the studio, Burns and Hanlon are kissing when the “Middletons” walk by her dressing room. They have been given jobs on the next Barrymore picture as a reward for helping to bring Lola back to the fold. Infuriated, Burns flees. Hanlon jumps into the moving car. They are about to kiss when the supposed lunatic who has been pursuing her throughout the film, claiming to be her husband, sticks his head in the window. He greets Hanlon and asks “How’m I doin’?” Fade out on the battling couple.

Cast
 Jean Harlow as Lola Burns
 Lee Tracy as E.J. "Space" Hanlon
 Frank Morgan as Pops Burns
 Franchot Tone as Gifford Middleton
 Pat O'Brien as Jim Brogan
 Una Merkel as Mac
 Ted Healy as Junior Burns
 Ivan Lebedeff as Hugo, Marquis Di Binelli Di Pisa
 Isabel Jewell as Lily, Junior's Girl Friend (as Isobel Jewell)
 Louise Beavers as Loretta
 Leonard Carey as Winters
 Mary Forbes as Mrs. Middleton
 C. Aubrey Smith as Mr. Wendell Middleton
 June Brewster as Alice Cole

Critical reception
Critical reviews were generally positive. Motion Picture Herald called the film "a comedy wow of the first water," and "one of the funniest, speediest, most nonsensical pictures ever to hit a screen." The Daily News Standard from Pennsylvania gave praise to the film, saying that "Jean Harlow and Lee Tracy together for the first time as co-stars are said to have provided the biggest truckload of laughs to roll out of Hollywood in the hilarious picture." However, Mordaunt Hall for The New York Times said Bombshell has moments where "the comedy is too rambunctious and scenes which are not precisely convincing." He did say it is merry for the most part, and said that Jean Harlow was thoroughly "in her element" as the character Lola Burns.

Production
Bombshell is a pre-code screwball comedy. The story satirizes the stardom years of Clara Bow: "Lola Burns" – Clara Bow, "E. J. Hanlon" – B. P. Schulberg, "Pops Burns" – Robert Bow, "Mac" – Daisy DeVoe, "Gifford Middleton" – Rex Bell. Director Victor Fleming was Bow's fiancée in 1926.

The Laredo Times from Laredo, Texas, quotes Harlow in an interview about filming saying, "Thank goodness, it was not necessary for me to get in the rain barrel in Bombshell. I had to pick too many splinters out of myself the last time," referring to the 1932 film Red Dust, in which Harlow takes a bath in a rain barrel.

The success of the film led to Jean Harlow being widely known as a "Blonde Bombshell."

Early in the film, Lola Burns is told she has to shoot re-takes of Red Dust — the title of an actual Harlow/Gable vehicle from the year before. In fact, there's a brief kissing scene with Gable, in the frenetic opening sequence of photos, scenes, and shots of fans, taken from Hold Your Man (1933).

According to the Worldwide Guide to Movie Locations, scenes in Bombshell were shot at MGM studios in Culver City. The nightclub scene was filmed at Cocoanut Grove at the Ambassador Hotel in mid-town Los Angeles. It was demolished in 2006.

References

External links
 
 
 
 

1933 films
1930s romantic comedy-drama films
American romantic comedy-drama films
American black-and-white films
Films about actors
Films about filmmaking
American films based on plays
Films directed by Victor Fleming
Films produced by Irving Thalberg
Metro-Goldwyn-Mayer films
Films with screenplays by Jules Furthman
1933 comedy films
1933 drama films
1930s English-language films
1930s American films